Walram II may refer to:

 Walram II of Limburg (c. 1085–1139)
 Walram II, Count of Nassau (ca. 1220 – 1276)